The Scotland cricket team toured Hong Kong in January 2016. The tour consisted of a first-class match, two One Day Internationals (ODIs) and two Twenty20 Internationals (T20I) match. The first-class match was part of the 2015–17 ICC Intercontinental Cup and the ODIs were part of the 2015–17 ICC World Cricket League Championship.

The ICC Intercontinental Cup match was abandoned without a ball bowled, due to a waterlogged pitch. The ODI was the first one to be played in Hong Kong, with Hong Kong beating Scotland by 109 runs. The T20I series was drawn 1–1.

Squads

Intercontinental Cup

ODI series

T20I series

1st T20I

2nd T20I

References

External links
 Series home at ESPN Cricinfo

2016 in Scottish cricket
2016 in Hong Kong cricket
International cricket competitions in 2015–16
International cricket tours of Hong Kong